Forever Storm is the debut studio album by Serbian heavy metal band Forever Storm, released in 2009.

The album cover designed by comic book  artist Bane Kerac.

Track listing 
"Gunslinger" - 4:29
"It Rains" - 3:58
"Battle Cry" - 5:49
"Soul Revolution" - 5:49
"Trace in Eternity" - 4:47
"Storm - 4:56
"Once Again" - 5:31
"The Outcast" - 4:04
"Who I Am" - 3:49
"For You" [bonus track] - 4:41

Personnel 
Stefan Kovačević - vocals, guitar
Miloš Miletić - guitar
Vladimir Nestrorović - bass guitar
Vuk Stefanović - drums
Nikola Marić - keyboards

Production 
Ivan Ilić - mixing, producer
Dobrica Andrić - engineer, mastering engineer

References 

Forever Storm albums
2009 debut albums
One Records (Serbia) albums